Love is an unincorporated community in Augusta County, Virginia, United States.

Love is located on the Blue Ridge Parkway, within the Mount Pleasant National Scenic Area. At the beginning of the 20th century the area was home to over 1000 people who farmed the surrounding mountains & hollows.  Situated on the natural route between the Tye River Valley and the Shenandoah Valley, Love had a general store, post office, church and blacksmith. Love was a remote outpost until the Blue Ridge Parkway was constructed in 1936.   The parkway changed mountain life and people moved away from homesteading and subsistence farming. The historic Mountain Top church and small cemetery remain.
 
Love Ridge Mountain Lodging, located on the ridge above Love, offers cabins and vacation rentals open year round and shares a border with the Blue Ridge Parkway.  Love Ridge was initially conceived of as the Meadow Mountain Campground in the 1950s. The cabins and houses were built in the 1990s and early 2000s and attract visitors drawn to the beautiful scenery and peaceful mountain setting.

References

Unincorporated communities in Augusta County, Virginia
Unincorporated communities in Virginia